Great Heaton (also known as Over Heaton and Heaton Reddish) was a township in the parish of Prestwich-cum-Oldham and hundred of Salford, in Lancashire, England. It was occupied land between Prestwich and Manchester, near Heaton Park.

It formed part of the "Manchester poor law Union", 1841–50, but in 1850 was included in "Prestwich poor law Union". It should not be confused with Heaton township, near Bolton, or Heaton Norris township, between Manchester and Stockport. Following the Local Government Act 1894 the township was dissolved and its area divided between the Municipal Borough of Middleton and Prestwich Urban District.

In 1903 the Heaton Park area became part of the city of Manchester.

History of Lancashire
Areas of Manchester